San Juan Atepec  is a town and municipality in Oaxaca in south-western Mexico. The municipality covers an area of 88.03 km². It is part of the Ixtlán District in the Sierra Norte region. As of 2005, the municipality had a total population of 1301.

References

Municipalities of Oaxaca